Blinman is a locality incorporating two towns located in the Australian state of South Australia within the Flinders Ranges about  north of the state capital of Adelaide.  It is very small but has the claim of being the highest surveyed town in South Australia. It serves as a base for large acre pastoralists and tourism.  The town is just north of the Flinders Ranges National Park, is 60 kilometres north of Wilpena Pound.

History

Indigenous people
This land belonged to the Adnyamathanha tribe, of Indigenous Australians prior to colonisation.  One of their unique customs was burn offs (controlled bushfires) to promote plant growth in the future seasons.

European settlement 
The first European settlement around the current Blinman, was firstly of Angorichina Station.  This land was taken up for sheep farming in the 1850s.  A shepherd employed by the station, Robert Blinman, discovered a copper outcrop on a hot December day in 1859.  Blinman gambled some of his money on the presence of more underground copper and received a mineral application in 1860.  On 1 January 1861, Blinman and three friends, Alfred Frost, Joe Mole and Henry Alfred, received the lease for the land that became Blinman.

Mining was successful in the first year and the mine became known as Wheal Blinman.  The original four leaseholders sold their mine in February 1862, for about 150 times the purchase price.  The new owners were the Yudnamutana Copper Mining Company of South Australia, who also owned a rich deposit north of Blinman.  The mine was very successful during the 1860s and the site became permanent, with buildings being constructed and more miners moving to the area, some from the Burra mine.  The hardest problems at the time were the transport of Ore and the finding of water.  Over the next 20 years, railways were developed and wells were sunk at regular intervals making settlement easier.

Family life was hard in the early days. Both water and firewood had to be brought from long
distances from the mine.  This job was left to the women and their elder children while the men were working.  Many pregnancies failed in the early years and there were several deaths reported from inflammation of the lungs.  With the original tent settlement being very close to the mine, it was very hard to escape the fine dust generated.  A hotel and post office were first opened in Blinman in 1863. In 1864, a government surveyor laid out 162 allotments about three km from the mine.  This was named Blinman.  The population was about 1,500 by 1868 and the first school opened that year.  Decent shops in the main street developed in 1869.  The striking of regular water in the mine the same year secured a regular water supply for the town.

Mining continued until 1918 when the ore ran out.  The busiest time for the mine was 1913–1918 with a town population of 2,000. The total ore removed was about 10,000 tonnes.

Administrative area history

The government town of Blinman was surveyed in January 1864 without an official government proclamation and was named after Robert Blinman. The government town of Blinman North was surveyed in July 1867 on nearby land and also was not the subject of an official proclamation. In 1986, the former Blinman was renamed Blinman South, and the former Blinman North was renamed Blinman.

In October 2003, the locality of Blinman was created, incorporating both towns within new boundaries. On 26 April 2013, additional land was added to the locality.

Heritage listings

Blinman has a number of heritage-listed sites, including:

 Blinman Dome Diapir
 Blinman Mine and Mine Manager's Cottage
 Mine Road Dwelling and Dugout

Attractions 
Tourists travel to this area to enjoy the Outback of South Australia and to see the ancient geology of the area. The town is close to Brachina Gorge and Parachilna Gorge. These two rarely have flowing water in them.  Also nearby are the Blinman Pools. The town is a stop off on the way to Arkaroola.  The copper mine at one end of the town is another attraction.

The town itself boasts a pub, general store, a church and a cafe/gallery.  There are tennis courts, a golf course and a cricket pitch, though they see sporadic use. Fuel is not available.

Cook Out Back festival
Cook Out Back is a relaxed campfire cooking competition held over the Labour Day long weekend in October, involving a roast prepared using a camp oven on a bed of coals.  The event attracts more than 500 people to the town, who camp throughout the area.  As the biggest event on the town's calendar, it brings significant tourist income.

Governance
Blinman is located within the federal division of Grey, the state electoral district of Stuart and the Pastoral Unincorporated Area of South Australia. As of 2019, the community within Blinman received municipal services from a South Australian government agency, the Outback Communities Authority.

The Aboriginal Regional Authority for the Blinman area is the Adnyamathanha Traditional Lands Association.

In popular culture

 In the 2011 novel Angorichina, the character of Heath Denbow came from, and was buried at, Blinman.

References

External links

Manning index of placenames

Mining towns in South Australia
Flinders Ranges
Far North (South Australia)
Places in the unincorporated areas of South Australia